Qorovulbozor is a city and seat of Qorovulbozor District in Bukhara Region in Uzbekistan. Its population was 6,448 in 1989, and 9,200 in 2016.

References

Populated places in Bukhara Region
Cities in Uzbekistan